Mansriggs is a settlement and civil parish in the South Lakeland district, in the county of Cumbria, England. Because of its small population, in the 2011 census the parish was grouped with Osmotherley. It has a joint parish council with Egton with Newland and Osmotherley. Mansriggs was Manslarig in 1520. Mansriggs Hall is a two-storey farmhouse in the parish.

The parish contains one listed building, a bridge, and one scheduled monument, a former blast furnace, blacking mill, and associated buildings.

References

External links
 Cumbria County History Trust: Mansriggs (nb: provisional research only – see Talk page)

 
 Mansriggs: historical and genealogical information at GENUKI

Villages in Cumbria
Civil parishes in Cumbria
South Lakeland District